Dulani Anuradha is a Sri Lankan Sinhalese Film actress and a dancer by profession. She is best known for the roles in films, Aba, Vijaya Kuweni and Ahelepola Kumarihami.

Cinema career 
She primarily portrays characters in historical films and teledramas, but has also acted in fictional movies such as Sanghili and Paravarthana. Anuradha won a Best Actress award for her role in the film Vjaya Kuweni. Dulani plays the major role in most of director, Sugath Samarakoon’s films. She played the main role in Bahu-Barya 2 directed by Udayakantha Warnakulasooriya.

Filmography
 No. denotes the Number of Sri Lankan film in the Sri Lankan cinema.

Television roles
She acted in few television serials and known to refuse many soap operas. She acted as Pabalu in the serial Wahinna Muthu Wessak. She played roles in Sumithra Rahubadda’s Pinibara Yamaya (as Udathari Manamendra) and Maha Polowa Ape Newei as well. She acted in a negative role in the drama Oba Ayemath Avidin.

Anuradha was represented as a judge in many reality shows such as Laugfs on Stage season I, Derana City of Dance and Derana Little Star.

Selected serials
 Maha Polowa Ape Newei
 Oba Ayemath Avidin
 Pinibara Yamaya
 Sakisanda Suwaris
 Wahinna Muthu Wessak

Awards and accolades
Her acting career made a turning point, when she won the award for the best actress at many local film festival for the role Gumbaka Butha in Jackson Anthony's film Aba.

OCIC Awards

|-
|| 2008 ||| Aba || Best Actress ||

Sarasaviya Awards

|-
|| 2008 ||| Aba || Best Actress ||

SIGNIS Awards

|-
|| 2012 ||| Vijaya Kuweni || Best Actress ||

References

External links
 Dulani Anuradha in National Film Corporation of Sri Lanka

Living people
Sinhalese actresses
Sri Lankan film actresses
Year of birth missing (living people)